Xeranoplium tricallosum is a species of beetle in the family Cerambycidae. It was described by Knull in 1938.

References

Hesperophanini
Beetles described in 1938